Adrien Dumont de Chassart (born 1 March 2000) is a Belgian amateur golfer. 

When he was 15, he finished second in the Orange Bowl tournament in Miami, one of the major tournaments for players of 18 years or under. In 2019, he was awarded Belgian Male Amateur Golfer of the Year. In 2021, he finished third at the European Amateur Championships.

Since 2018, he studies at the University of Illinois. He was part of the international team at the Arnold Palmer Cup in 2021 and 2022. In 2021, he was named one of the two Big Ten Golfers of the Year.

In 2022, he played at the U.S. Open, one of the four professional majors, after coming through the qualification tournament in Springfield, Ohio.

Amateur wins
2015 King's Prize
2017 Internationaux de France U18 - Trophee Carlhian, Grand Prix AFG, Belgian International Amateur Championship & National Stroke Play Championship, Belgian National Juniors U18, International Juniors of Belgium, European Men's Club Trophy
2018 Grand Prix AFG
2019 Tar Heel Intercollegiate, Big Ten Championship
2020 Golfweek Purdue Amateur
2022 Boilermaker Invitational

Source:

Results in major championships

CUT = missed the half-way cut

Team appearances
European Boys' Team Championship (representing Belgium): 2015, 2016, 2017, 2018
European Amateur Team Championship (representing Belgium): 2017, 2019, 2021
Jacques Léglise Trophy (representing Continent of Europe): 2017 (winners)
Eisenhower Trophy (representing Belgium): 2018, 2022
Arnold Palmer Cup (representing International team): 2021, 2022 (winners)

Source:

References

Belgian male golfers
Illinois Fighting Illini men's golfers
2000 births
Living people